Ikarus is a computer chess program created by brothers Munjong and Muntsin Kolss.

History

Development 
Development began in 1997 and it competed in its first ICGA event in 1998 at the 9th World Computer Chess Championship, held in Paderborn, finishing in 26th place with 2 points from 7 games. Three years later in Maastricht it performed much more strongly, finishing in eighth place with 4.5/9 and scoring 5/9 for sixth place in the World Computer Speed Chess Championship.

Champion of the World 
Ikarus won the World Computer Speed Chess Championship, held in Turin in May 2006. It finished in ninth place at the World Championship main event.

References

Chess engines